is a former Japanese football player and manager he is the current assistant head coach J2 League team Zweigen Kanazawa .

Playing career
Kudo was born in Amagasaki on June 21, 1974. After graduating from high school, he joined Yamaha Motors (later Júbilo Iwata) in 1993. He played many matches as mainly right midfielder. The club won the champions 1997 J1 League and 1998 J.League Cup. In late 1998, he moved to Avispa Fukuoka on loan. Although the club results were bad, the club stayed J1 League. In 1999, he returned to Júbilo Iwata. He became a regular player as right side back. However he lost regular position in 2000 and he moved to Cerezo Osaka in May 2000. He could not become a regular player and the club was relegated to J2 in 2002. From 2002, he became a regular player and the club returned to J1 from 2003. He played as many positions in midfielder position. In 2006, he moved to Avispa Fukuoka. Although he played as regular player, the club was relegated to J2 from 2007. From 2007, he played many matches as regular player and the club was promoted to J1 from 2011. However he retired end of 2010 season.

Coaching career
After the retirement, Kudo started coaching career at Avispa Fukuoka in 2011. He mainly coached for youth team. In 2016, he moved to Roasso Kumamoto and became a coach for top team. In 2018, he returned to Avispa and became a coach for top team. In June 2019, he became a manager as Fabio Pecchia successor.

Club statistics

Managerial statistics
Update; December 31, 2018

References

External links

1974 births
Living people
Association football people from Hyōgo Prefecture
Japanese footballers
J1 League players
J2 League players
Japan Football League (1992–1998) players
Júbilo Iwata players
Avispa Fukuoka players
Cerezo Osaka players
Association football midfielders
Japanese football managers
J2 League managers
Avispa Fukuoka managers
Thespakusatsu Gunma managers